The Delhi Legislative Assembly, also known as the Delhi Vidhan Sabha, is a unicameral legislature of the union territory of Delhi in India. Delhi Legislative Assembly is the legislative arm of the  Government of Delhi. At present, it consists of 70 members, directly elected from 70 constituencies. The tenure of the Legislative Assembly is five years unless dissolved sooner.

The seat of assembly is the Old Secretariat building, which is also the seat of the Government of Delhi.

History
The Delhi Legislative Assembly was first constituted on 7 March 1952 under the Government of Part C States Act, 1951; it was inaugurated by Home Minister K. N. Katju. The Assembly had 48 members, and a Council of Ministers in an advisory role to the Chief Commissioner of Delhi, though it also had powers to make laws. The first Council of Ministers was led by Chaudhary Brahm Prakash, who became the first Chief Minister of Delhi.

However, the States Reorganisation Commission, set up in 1953, led to the Constitutional amendment through States Reorganisation Act, 1956, which came into effect on 1 November 1956. This meant that Delhi was no longer a Part-C State and was made a Union Territory under the direct administration of the President of India. Also the Delhi Legislative Assembly and the Council of Ministers were abolished simultaneously. Subsequently, the Delhi Municipal Corporation Act, 1957 was enacted which led to the formation the Municipal Corporation.

In September 1966, with "The Delhi Administration Act, 1966", the assembly was replaced by the Delhi Metropolitan Council with 56 elected and five nominated members with the Lt. Governor of Delhi as its head. The Council however had no legislative powers, only an advisory role in the governance of Delhi. This set up functioned until 1990.

This Council was finally replaced by the Delhi Legislative Assembly through the Constitution (Sixty-ninth Amendment) Act, 1991, followed by the Government of National Capital Territory of Delhi Act, 1991 the Sixty-ninth Amendment to the Constitution of India, which declared the Union Territory of Delhi to be formally known as National Capital Territory of Delhi and also supplements the constitutional provisions relating to the Legislative Assembly and the Council of Ministers and related matters. The Legislative Assembly is selected for period of five years, and presently it is the seventh assembly, which was selected through the 2020 Legislative Assembly election.

Assembly building
The building was originally built in 1912, designed by E. Montague Thomas to hold the Imperial Legislative Council and subsequently the Central Legislative Assembly (after 1919), until the newly constructed Parliament House of India in New Delhi (Sansad Bhawan) was inaugurated on 18 January 1927.

The building also housed the Secretariat of the Government of India, and was built after the capital of India shifted to Delhi from Calcutta. The temporary secretariat building was constructed in a few months' time in 1912. It functioned as the Secretariat for another decade, before the offices shifted to the present Secretariat Building on Raisina Hill.

List of assemblies

7th Delhi Assembly
The Seventh Legislative Assembly of Delhi was constituted on 16 February 2020 after the 2020 Delhi Legislative Assembly elections were concluded earlier on 8 February 2020 and the results were announced on 11 February 2020.

See also
 Delhi Metropolitan Council
 List of constituencies of the Delhi Legislative Assembly
 List of chief ministers of Delhi
 List of deputy chief ministers of Delhi
 List of speakers of the Delhi Legislative Assembly

References

External links
Official Site of Legislature in Delhi
Legislative Bodies of India- Delhi
"The Government of National Capital Territory of Delhi Act, 1991" at the National Informatics Centre website

 
Government of Delhi
Delhi
Politics of Delhi
Unicameral legislatures